Daniel Crawford (7 December 1869 – 3 June 1926), also known as 'Konga Vantu', was a Scottish missionary of the Plymouth Brethren in central-southern Africa.

He was born in Gourock, son of a Clyde boat captain. He was influenced to go to Africa by meeting Frederick Arnot in 1888, a missionary who had just returned from two years at Bunkeya, capital of the Garenganze King, Msiri, where he had founded the Plymouth Brethren's Garenganze Evangelical Mission.  

Crawford arrived at Bunkeya in 1890 to join two Plymouth Brethren already at the mission. He was therefore a junior observer rather than a player in the dramatic events of late 1891 when British and Belgian expeditions competed to take Msiri's kingdom into their respective colonies, and Msiri was killed by Lieutenant Bodson of the Belgian expedition, 

In the aftermath of the killing and a massacre of Msiri's men, the 10,000-strong population of Bunkeya fled into the bush, and Crawford moved to the western shore of Lake Mweru and established a mission there. The Congo Free State's agents took over Katanga with a brutality which caused many refugees to come to Crawford's mission, which was the origin of his nickname 'Konga Vantu' which means 'gatherer of the people'. Crawford also persuaded many chiefs to give up their slaves whom he took into his mission. Soon he had to move to a better site which could support more people at the Luanza River near where it flows into Lake Mweru.

Crawford was an individualist who did not work well for long in the company of his seniors or colleagues, but he did much to travel around the Luapula valley founding and encouraging other outposts of the Garenganze Evangelical Mission. He studied African languages and sought to understand African customs and traditional rule, and was a frequent visitor to chiefs such as Mwata Kazembe. When the latter rebelled against and was defeated by the British, Crawford and his mission colleagues had a role in persuading the chief to accept the inevitable and to achieve a working relationship with the colonial authorities. He wrote two influential books, of which one, Thinking Black was recommended reading for those Europeans who wanted to work in partnership with, rather than over, Africans. 

Crawford also encouraged other Protestant missions to come to Luapula, such as the London Missionary Society, and he was invited to open their Mbereshi Mission in 1900. 

Despite once believing that a missionary should not marry, Crawford married Grace Tilsley and continued to be based at Luanza until his death in 1926. He only returned to Britain once, although he did visit the US and Australia to recruit missionaries and obtain funding.

One of Dan Crawford's grandchildren is Mairi Hedderwick, author and illustrator of the Katie Morag series of children's picture books.

References

External links
 

Scottish Protestant missionaries
Scottish evangelicals
Protestant missionaries in the Democratic Republic of the Congo
Scottish Plymouth Brethren
1869 births
1926 deaths
British expatriates in the Democratic Republic of the Congo